This is a list of bus routes operated by the Washington Metropolitan Area Transit Authority (WMATA), branded as Metrobus in Northern Virginia. Most routes operated under Northern Virginia trolleys, the Alexandria, Barcroft and Washington Transit Company (AB&W), and the Washington Virginia & Maryland Coach Company (WV&M) prior to the 1960s.

Numbering
Most Metrobus routes in VA begin with a single or double digit number followed by a letter.

History
Many current routes operate under former streetcar routes. The streetcars provided the main transportation in the Northern Virginia area from the 1800s to the 1940s. The Alexandria, Barcroft and Washington Transit Company (AB&W) and the Washington Virginia & Maryland Coach Company (WV&M) operated some of the routes prior to 1973. In 1973, WMATA acquired the two bus companies along with other bus companies to form its current Metrobus system. At one point, most MD routes would enter into Downtown before Metro was built in which all buses would terminate at stations in various locations. Today, the main Northern VA hub is at Pentagon station which connects to Arlington Transit, DASH, Fairfax Connector, Loudoun County Transit, PRTC OmniRide, and Ride Smart Northern Shenandoah Valley lines.

Due to the COVID-19 pandemic, service has been mostly reduced to Sunday service schedules during the weekdays with select routes both added and suspended from March 18 until August 22, 2020. Routes 16C, 28A, 29K, 29N, and REX were the only routes that ran during the weekends with the rest of the routes suspended. On August 23, 2020, more routes came back during the weekdays and weekends returning Metrobus service to 75%.

Routes
Most Virginia Metrobus routes operate inside Northern Virginia. However a few routes will go into Downtown DC under former streetcar routings and demand.

Routes history

Former routes
During the years, Fairfax Connector, DASH, Arlington Transit, and PRTC OmniRide took over parts of Northern Virginia for WMATA as it would be easier to operate and maintain. Some of the discontinued routes from WMATA are now operated under those bus carriers. Other routes were discontinued due to either low ridership, duplication of another route, merged into other routes, or low funding. However some routes would be reincarnated into new routes for Metrobus. Examples of reincarnations were the 7M, 16C, and 26A.

See also 
 List of Metrobus routes (Washington, D.C.)
 List of Metrobus routes in Washington, D.C.
 List of Metrobus routes in Maryland

References

External links 
Virginia Timetables

Routes
Washington D.C.
Bus routes, Washington